Alfred Georges Naccache (or Naqqache) (3 May 1888– 26 September 1978) was a Lebanese Maronite statesman, Prime Minister and head of state during the French Mandate of Lebanon. In 1919 he contributed to La Revue Phénicienne which was established by Charles Corm in Beirut. He was serving as Prime Minister when he was appointed president by the French authorities after the resignation of Emile Edde. Pierre-Georges Arlabosse served as acting president for 6 days before Naccache assumed office. From 1953 to 1955 he served as Foreign Minister. The National Museum of Beirut was opened by him on 27 May 1942.

A street in the Lebanese capital Beirut is named in his honor.

References

External links

Jewish Virtual Library, List of Rulers of Lebanon (source for birth/death dates)

Prime Ministers of Lebanon
Presidents of Lebanon
World War II political leaders
1888 births
1978 deaths
Lebanese Maronites
Lebanon under French rule